Erythrolamprus mimus, the mimic false coral snake, is a species of snake in the family Colubridae. The species is found in Honduras, Nicaragua, Costa Rica, Panama, Ecuador, Peru, and Colombia.

References

Erythrolamprus
Reptiles of Honduras
Reptiles of Peru
Reptiles described in 1868
Taxa named by Edward Drinker Cope